State Road 120 (NM 120) is a  state road in the U.S. state of New Mexico. The route traverses four counties: Colfax, Mora, Harding, and Union, and is the longest state road in New Mexico. The highway's only grade-separated interchange is with Interstate 25 (I-25) in Wagon Mound.

Route description

Starting as paved road in the far southwestern corner of Colfax County in the community of Black Lake at the intersection with Route 434, New Mexico State Road 120 changes into an unpaved road just before mile marker 3. It travels east around the northern edge of Ocate Mesa and then heads southeast down Manueles Canyon on the northeastern side of Ocate Mesa.  Due east of the top of Ocate Mesa it enters Mora County and heads south-southeast.  Passing the south end of Ocate Mesa, the road heads southeast and at mile marker 12 the surface becomes paved again. In winter, this unpaved section is prone to heavy ice, snowpack, and mud.

After mile marker 12, the road continues southeastward passing the unpaved Los Le Febres turnoff on the right (to the west). At this point Manueles Creek on the left side of the road is joined by Wheaton Creek to form Ocate Creek, and the road follows Ocate Creek southeast with the Maxwell Land Grant on the left (NE) and the Mora Land Grant on the right (SW). The road then enters the community of Ocate where it intersects with Route 442. Leaving Ocate again alongside Ocate Creek, the road heads east twisting through the foothills of Los Naranjos Peak to the south in the Ocate Creek water gap into the community of Naranjos. Just before the town the road turns east and still on the west side of Wagon Mound, it has its only interchange at its intersection with I-25 (exit 387). The road then crosses the intercontinental railroad tracks of the BNSF Railway. Within Wagon Mound the road heads east and is called Park Avenue.

Crossing the Canadian River bridge the road enters  Harding County and  then heads north-northeast about   into the town of Roy. The road comes into Roy as the Wagon Mound Highway, then zags up to Second Street and then up to Third Street where it intersects with Route 39. Then heading three blocks east as Third Street, the road turns due north as Floersheim Street and leaves Roy as the Yates Highway. A dirt road continues north at that point for a couple of miles into the Don Carlos Hills.

Major intersections

See also

 List of state roads in New Mexico

References

External links

120
Transportation in Colfax County, New Mexico
Transportation in Mora County, New Mexico
Transportation in Harding County, New Mexico
Transportation in Union County, New Mexico